Naff or NAFF may refer to:

People:
 William E. Naff, an American scholar of Japanese language
 Lycia Naff, actress
 D-Naff (born 1974), a Namibian award-winning Gospel rapper, and a former street gangster
 Petty Naff, a notorious rowdy of the Know-Nothing Riot of 1856
 Kevin Naff, editor at the Washington Blade

Acronym:
 National Association for Freedom
 Nederlandse American Football Federatie (see American football in the Netherlands)

Other:
 Naff (Polari), UK slang meaning 'inferior, tacky'

See also
 Naf River